San Pedro Seadogs is a Belizean football team which currently competes in the Premier League of Belize of the Football Federation of Belize.

The team is based in San Pedro.  Their home stadium is Ambergris Stadium.

The team played from 2009 to 2012

Current squad

External links
San Pedro Seadogs

Football clubs in Belize
1997 establishments in Belize
Association football clubs established in 1997